José Manuel Cerezo Moreno (born 23 June 1973 in Málaga) is a Spanish former middle-distance runner who specialised in the 800 metres. He represented his country at the 2000 Summer Olympics as well as two World Championships. In addition, he reached the final at the 1994 European Championships.

International competitions

Personal bests
Outdoor
400 metres – 48.36.02 (Getafe 1993)
600 metres – 1:20.62 (Andújar 2006)
800 metres – 1:45.31 (Zürich 2000)
1000 metres – 2:19.68 (Madrid 1994)
1500 metres – 3:37.67 (San Sebastián 2003)
3000 metres – 8:08.24 (Berlin 2006)
Indoor
800 metres – 1:49.63 (Piraeus 1998)
1000 metres – 2:25.05 (Madrid 1998)
1500 metres – 3:48.05 (Valencia 2003)
3000 metres – 8:08.29 (Zaragoza 2003)

References

All-Athletics profile

1973 births
Living people
Spanish male middle-distance runners
World Athletics Championships athletes for Spain
Olympic athletes of Spain
Athletes (track and field) at the 2000 Summer Olympics
Sportspeople from Málaga